Balachandra Akhil (born 7 October 1977) is an Indian cricketer who plays for Karnataka. He is a right-handed middle-order batsman and medium-fast bowler. He was a part of the Karnataka Under-19 team for the 1995 Cooch Behar Trophy and became a part of the senior team in 1998. He was a part of Royal Challengers Bangalore for the first three seasons of the Indian Premier League and played for Kochi Tuskers Kerala in the fifth season.

He captained the Provident Bangalore in 2010 Karnataka Premier League.

References

1977 births
Living people
Karnataka cricketers
Kochi Tuskers Kerala cricketers
South Zone cricketers
Royal Challengers Bangalore cricketers
Indian cricketers
Cricketers from Bangalore